In Germanic mythology, Myrkviðr (Old Norse "dark wood" or "black forest") is the name of several European forests. 

The direct derivatives of the name occur as a place name both in Sweden and Norway. Related forms of the name occur elsewhere in Europe, such as in the Black Forest (Schwarzwald), and may thus be a general term for dark and dense forests of ancient Europe.

The name was anglicised by Sir Walter Scott (in Waverley) and William Morris (in The House of the Wolfings) and later popularized by J. R. R. Tolkien as "Mirkwood".

Etymology
The word myrkviðr is a compound of two words. The first element is myrkr "dark", which is cognate to, among others, the English adjectives mirky and murky. The second element is viðr "wood, forest".

Attestations
The name is attested as a  mythical local name of a forest in the Poetic Edda poem Lokasenna, and the heroic poems Atlakviða, Helgakviða Hundingsbana I and Hlöðskviða, and in prose in Fornmanna sögur, Flateyjarbók, Hervarar Saga, Ála flekks saga. 

The localization of Myrkviðr varies by source:
 The Ore Mountains in the writings of Thietmar of Merseburg.
 The forests north of the Ukrainian steppe during the time of the Goths the Huns in the Norse Hervarar saga
 The forest that separates the Huns from the Burgundians
 Kolmården ("the dark forest"), in Sweden, in Sögubrot and in legends such as that of Helge Hundingsbane
 The forest south of Uppsala in Styrbjarnar þáttr Svíakappa (the present remnant of this forest is called Lunsen)
 Uncertain locations, such as in the Völundarkviða, where it is probably located elsewhere in Scandinavia (Weyland is here described as a Finnish prince, which would make him a Saami prince). Stanza 1 (on the swan maidens):

 Mythological. In other sources, such as the Poetic Edda, e.g. Lokasenna, the location seems to be between Asgard and Muspelheim, as Muspell's sons ride through it at Ragnarök.  Stanza 42:

Theories
J. R. R. Tolkien comments on Myrkviðr in a letter to his eldest grandson:

Regarding the forests, Francis Gentry comments that "in the Norse tradition 'crossing the Black Forest' came to signify penetrating the barriers between one world and another, especially the world of the gods and the world of fire, where Surt lives [...]."

Modern influence
It was first anglicized as Mirkwood by William Morris in A Tale of the House of the Wolfings from 1888, and later by J. R. R. Tolkien in his fiction.

See also
 Járnviðr
 Hercynian Forest, an ancient forest of southern Germany
 Miriquidi

Notes

References

 Bugge, Sophus (1896).  Helge-digtene i den Ældre Edda. G. E. C. Gad
 Bjordvand, Harald; Lindeman, Fredrik Otto (2007). Våre arveord. Novus. 
 
 Carpenter, Humphrey (1981). The Letters of J. R. R. Tolkien. London: Allen & Unwin
 Chadwick, Nora K. (1922).  Anglo-Saxon and Norse poems. Cambridge: The University press
 Cleasby, Richard; Vigfusson, Gudbrand (1874).  Icelandic–English Dictionary. Oxford: Clarendon Press
 Simek, Rudolf (2007) translated by Angela Hall. Dictionary of Northern Mythology. D.S. Brewer. 

Locations in Norse mythology
Tyrfing cycle
Mythological forests